U-230 was a Type VIIC U-boat built for Nazi Germany's navy (Kriegsmarine) for service during World War II.

She was laid down on 25 November 1941, at the Krupp yard in Kiel as yard number 660, launched on 10 September, and commissioned on 24 October 1942, with Kapitänleutnant Paul Siegmann in command. Her First Officer, during her first three war patrols, was Herbert Werner, author of the best-selling postwar memoir Iron Coffins. She carried out three patrols and was a member of three wolfpacks before moving to the Mediterranean. She was scuttled there by her crew when the Allies landed near Toulon, France, on 21 August 1944.

Design
German Type VIIC submarines were preceded by the shorter Type VIIB submarines. U-230 had a displacement of  when at the surface and  while submerged. She had two shafts and two  propellers.

U-230 was fitted with five  torpedo tubes (four fitted at the bow and one at the stern), fourteen torpedoes, one  SK C/35 naval gun, 220 rounds, and an anti-aircraft gun. The boat had a complement of between forty-four and sixty.

Service history

First patrol
U-230s initial sortie began on 4 February 1943, when she left Kiel, arriving at Bergen on 9 February; she departed from Bergen on 11 February, for a war patrol east of Newfoundland with group Burggraf.

The bad weather and difficult sea conditions encountered are described by Werner in his book: The weather was so bad that personnel on watch on the bridge were forced to wear rubber diving suits and eye masks. They had to be secured to the wildly pitching and yawing U-boat by steel belts. Below, it was no better, with bodies being hurled in all directions.

Burggraf had no success and was disbanded on 5 March, with U-230 and others forming the nucleus of group Westmark.

On 6 March, U-230 joined group Westmark; that day  made contact with convoy SC 121, a slow eastbound convoy of 59 ships. and U-230 together with  engaged that night, sinking the freighter Egyptian. 
Over the next three days, Westmark kept in contact, and a total of eight ships were sunk, but Seigmann and U-230 had no further success. On 10 March, BdU called off the attack.

On 11 March, Westmark was disbanded and U-230 returned to base, arriving at Brest on 31 March.

Second patrol
U-230 set out for her second patrol on 24 April 1943. After safely negotiating the Bay of Biscay, the boat joined group Drossel, a twelve-boat pack instructed to attack south-bound convoys supplying Allied forces in North Africa. Drossel was assisted by reconnaissance flights by air force Condors which reported two convoys on 3 May; one of 24 to 27 “barges” (actually large Landing Craft) and another southbound convoy of eleven ships bound for West Africa. 
During a disastrous attack on the LCTs, where no hits were scored, two U-boats were lost in a collision, and a couple of nights later two others damaged in a second collision.

On 6 May,  sighted SL 128, north-bound from West Africa, and all remaining Drossel boats moved to intercept. U-230 had no success but Seigmann continued to shadow the convoy until the operation was cancelled by BdU on 7 May.

The remaining Drossel boats were then instructed to move north-westwards to assist groups in the North Atlantic.
On 9 May, the five Drossel boats joined the U-boats of Rhein and Elbe groups which were in contact with convoy HX 237, and attacked the convoy over the next three days.
During this attack three ships were sunk and three U-boats destroyed (a ruinous exchange rate) but U-230 had no success.
On 12 May, while under air attack, U-230 shot down a Swordfish.
Werner reports in Iron Coffins that he himself fired the weapon that did this.

Following this U-230 returned to base, one of only four Drossel boats to complete a patrol and do so.

Chesapeake Bay

Arriving at the end of the month U-230 laid 8 TMC mines on the night of 26/27 July, in the mouth of Chesapeake Bay; a few days later U-566 laid 12 TMB mines nearby. Neither of these minefields achieved any sinkings.
Returning across the Atlantic U-566 sank the US patrol vessel  with the loss of more than 90 of her crew, sparking a massive ASW operation by the Tenth Fleet. Both U-boats escaped without detection.

To assist this operation both U-boats were to re-fuel in mid-ocean from the Kriegsmarines flotilla of Type XIV U-tankers; however a concerted campaign against these, leading to the destruction of four (out of ten) in July alone severely disrupted U-boat operations in the far oceans.

On 24 July, U-tanker  was destroyed two days out of Bordeaux. 
On 30 July, three U-boats, two of them Type XIVs, were attacked and destroyed by aircraft of the RAF and ships of FJ Walker's 2nd Support Group.
On 4 August, U-489 was sunk south of Iceland.
On 7 August, U-117 was destroyed, leaving U-230 and others in difficult straits.
On 24 August U-847, under Kptlt. Herbert Kuppisch, refueled several boats, including . Her commander found Kuppisch too casual about the threat of air attack, an observation repeated by Werner in his book.

Werner relates he asked them; "What's the matter with you people, don't you have any respect for aircraft?".

Kuppisch replied: "We haven't seen any since we passed Greenland."

Six U-boats re-fueled from U-847 on the morning of 27 August, U-230 included, but just hours later U-847 was sunk by aircraft from the escort carrier .
 
Dalhaus in U-634 attempted to attack but before he could do so he was himself attacked and destroyed by two escort vessels. U-230 escaped without being detected. and arrived back in Brest on 8 September 1943.

The Mediterranean
In November 1943, U-230 was reassigned to the Mediterranean, for attachment to 29th U-boat flotilla at Toulon. She departed Brest on 22 November, and by 5 December, had arrived at the Straits of Gibraltar 
Werner reports that the passage through the heavily defended Straits was uneventful; he also describes the boat's hydrophones picking up the sound of dolphins playing and "talking to each other". U-230 arrived at Toulon on 16 December. At this point Werner left U-230 for reassignment to his own command.

On 19 January 1944, U-230 left Toulon for a patrol against Allied shipping taking part in Operation Shingle, the Allied landings at Anzio. During this operation U-230 sank two Tank Landing Ships, on 16 and 20 February. She escaped retribution and returned to base at La Spezia on 24 February.

In April 1944, U-230 returned briefly to Toulon before departing on 11 April, to undertake another patrol in the Tyrrhenian Sea. On 9 May, she encountered and sank an American patrol craft, which was escorting a coastal convoy. She again escaped and returned to La Spezia on 21 May.

At the end of June, U-230 returned to Toulon where Seigmann relinquished command, handing over to Oblt. Heinz-Eugen Eberbach.

Air raids on Toulon in July and early August, and on Salamis, left the remaining 11 U-boats in the Mediterranean unserviceable; Five were wrecked at Toulon in the raid on 6 August, and the remaining three based there, including U-230, were scuttled to avoid capture following Operation Dragoon, the Allied landings in Southern France.

On 17 August 1944, Eberbach took U-230 out on her last voyage, scuttling her on 21 August, after she ran aground in Toulon Roads.

The crew managed to capture a fishing trawler and headed first for Italy, but later decided to head for Spain and internment instead when she received news about the course of the war in Italy. On 27 August 1944, the destroyer s radar picked up the trawler. The American warship was ordered to investigate and found the damaged fishing trawler with an inoperative engine and fifty Germans aboard. The crew of U-230 were taken prisoner. The trawler was taken in tow.

Summary of raiding history

References

Notes

Citations

Bibliography

Axel Neistle : German U-Boat Losses during World War II (1998).  
Herbert A Werner Iron Coffins (1969; reprinted 1999) Cassel

External links

German Type VIIC submarines
U-boats commissioned in 1942
World War II submarines of Germany
Ships built in Kiel
1942 ships
Maritime incidents in August 1944